In mathematical physics, a Pöschl–Teller potential, named after the physicists Herta Pöschl (credited as G. Pöschl) and Edward Teller, is a special class of potentials for which the one-dimensional Schrödinger equation can be solved in terms of special functions.

Definition

In its symmetric form is explicitly given by 

 
and the solutions of the time-independent Schrödinger equation
 
with this potential can be found by virtue of the substitution , which yields
 .
Moreover, eigenvalues and scattering data can be explicitly computed. In the special case of integer , the potential is reflectionless and such potentials also arise as the N-soliton solutions of the Korteweg-de Vries equation.

The more general form of the potential is given by

Rosen–Morse potential 
A related potential is given by introducing an additional term:

See also
 Morse potential
 Trigonometric Rosen–Morse potential

References list

External links
 Eigenstates for Pöschl-Teller Potentials

Quantum mechanical potentials
Mathematical physics
Edward Teller
Quantum models